Cyane was a Royal Navy sailing  sixth-rate ship of 22 guns, built in 1806 at Topsham, near Exeter, England. She was ordered in January 1805 as HMS Columbine and was renamed Cyane on 6 December of that year.

Under Captain Thomas Staines she captured the Spanish privateer Medusa in 1808 which was the last ship captured by the British before Spain turned against Napoleon. In May 1809 she was badly damaged during a battle with French gunboats and the French frigate Ceres.

With Constitutions second lieutenant Hoffman as prize master, she successfully escaped recapture by a pursuing British squadron on 12 March and arrived in America on 10 April. She was adjudicated by a prize court and purchased by the Navy and renamed USS Cyane.

Cyane cruised off the west coast of Africa from 1819–1820 and in the West Indies from 1820–1821 protecting the Liberian colony and suppressing piracy and the slave trade. In this regard she was a predecessor to the Africa Squadron. She cruised in the Mediterranean 1824–1825, and on the Brazil Station 1826–1827. Laid up at Philadelphia Navy Yard, she sank in 1835 and was raised and broken up the following year.

The April/May 1983 issue of American Heritage magazine carried an article "What it was like to be Shot up by Old Ironsides" concerning the discovery of three pages of HMS Cyanes logbook from 13 to 20 February 1815, with a transcription of 20 February 1815 battle.

See also
 Capture of Cyane

References

External links
 HMS Cyane at Ships of the Old Navy

Sailing frigates of the United States Navy
1806 ships
Ships built on the River Exe